Parepimelitta is a genus of beetles in the family Cerambycidae, containing the following species:

 Parepimelitta barriai (Cerda, 1968)
 Parepimelitta femoralis (Fairmaire & Germain, 1859)

References

Necydalopsini